State Route 194 (SR 194) is a  north–south state highway in Fayette County, Tennessee, connecting Rossville with Braden via Macon and Oakland.

Route description

SR 194 begins in Rossville at an intersection with SR 57. It heads north to pass through downtown along Church Street before leaving Rossville and crossing the Wolf River. The highway then travels northeast through farmland and rural areas as Rossville Road to pass through Macon, where it has a short concurrency with SR 193 (Macon Road). SR 194 then heads north as Oakland Road to enter Oakland, where it passes through subdivisions and downtown as Church Street to come to an intersection with U.S. Route 64 (US 64; in an unsigned concurrency with SR 15). It then passes through more subdivisions before leaving Oakland to cross the Loosahatchie River. The highway then comes to an end shortly thereafter at an intersection with SR 59, approximately halfway between Braden and Somerville. The entire route of SR 194 is a two-lane highway.

Future
An extension of SR 194 is planned to serve Ford Motor Company's Blue Oval City manufacturing facility to the north, which will begin operation in 2025. The northern terminus will be with US 70 in Tipton County, and a new interchange on Interstate 40 will be constructed with the extension, numbered exit 39.

Major intersections
The entire current route is in Fayette County.

References

194
Transportation in Fayette County, Tennessee